John Reginald Head (15 July 1868 – 15 May 1949) was an English first-class cricketer, active from 1892–98, who played for Middlesex. He was born in Hackney and died in Folkestone.

References

1868 births
1949 deaths
English cricketers
Middlesex cricketers
P. F. Warner's XI cricketers
A. J. Webbe's XI cricketers